The Broken Cord is a 1992 drama television film which aired on ABC. The film was directed by Ken Olin in his film directorial debut. It was adapted from the 1989 book of the same name by Michael Dorris. Both the book and the film are based on Dorris' life raising his special needs son.

Plot summary
A young Lakota boy named Adam (Michael Spears) is adopted by 26 year old David Norwell. Norwell is told that Adam might have mental retardation, but Norwell thinks that the boy will succeed in a loving environment. He has to deal with the issues of raising a special needs child, such as having to take care of a child that has everything from toilet training trouble to seizures. After the discovery of a lesion in Adam's brain, it is later realized that Adam does not have a learning disability as earlier believed, but rather fetal alcohol syndrome.

Production
Jimmy Smits was asked to portray Dorris, with the character name of David Norwell, in 1989 which was shortly after the book was released. The actor said that he read the book in one night. Shortly after the book's release, 36 producers were interested in securing film rights to the book. The author did not want the film to be seen "as a disease-of-the-week movie". A television film was chosen over a theatrical film so that more people would experience the danger of drinking alcohol while pregnant. Smits' became emotional over his performance as David Norwell. Reynold Abel, on whom the character Adam was based, was struck and killed by a car at age 23 before the film's release in September 1991.

Reception
John J. O'Connor, writing for The New York Times, said, "Going against the television-movie grain, The Broken Cord provides no comforting payoff. The real Adam died last year after he was hit by a car. This is a story of profound anguish. It is also, however, a story of courage and powerful love on the part of both father and son." Ken Tucker of Entertainment Weekly wrote, "Adam (Reynold Abel in real life) died last year, only 23 years old, hit by a car; flawed as it is, TV’s The Broken Cord is a heartfelt testament to his life."

References

External links
IMDb

American drama television films
1992 television films
1992 films
1990s American films
Films about disability